Bocagrande is a neighbourhood in the city of Cartagena de Indias in Bolívar, Colombia. It was designed with first-world standards, such as residential areas of restricted access, and a separate plant for processing waste water.

Economy and culture 
Bocagrande is known in Cartagena for having the most important hotels of the city. It is one of the most expensive neighborhoods in the country, and is the most expensive and exclusive in the entire zone.

Is a wealthy neighborhood of the city, between the Avenida Santander and the Carrera 6.

Points of interest 
The neighborhood is near the Ciudad Amurallada, the most popular tourist attraction in the city, which has an old town, Hard Rock Cafe, and a lot of museums and theaters.

The neighborhood includes popular hotels, supermarkets, and cafes.

Geography 
The Bocagrande neighborhood is divided into zones, most of which are expensive and exclusive:
 Plaza Bocagrande: the first zone of the neighborhood. It connects the city center to Bocagrande. It has the second expensive mall in the whole country, Plaza Bocagrande, just behind the Centro Andino in Bogotá. It is the home of several monuments and landmarks, and has the most important hotel brands such as Hampton, Holiday Inn, and Decameron. It also has the important Estelar Hotel, which has a  tower, the tallest of the country. The zone has the Naval Hospital of Cartagena and the Hospital Santa Cruz de Bocagrande. It has the most populous beach of the neighborhood, as well as restaurants and supermarkets like McDonald's, Bubba Gump Shrimp Company, Crepes & Waffles, Subway, Carulla, Olímpica, and El Corral Hamburguers. This is the financial zone of the neighborhood, home to banks like Bancolombia and Citybank, In this zone one can find unofficial shops that sells brands such as Louis Vuitton, Bvlgari, Oscar de la Renta, Prada, Versace, Dolce & Gabbana, and Burberry. It is the second most exclusive zone of the whole country, just behind the Pink Zone of Bogotá, which have official boutiques of many brands.

The Rooftop of Bocagrande Plaza mall functions as a stage for events, receiving some artists such as Passenger (Runaway Tour), Riva (Hearts & Diamonds Tour), Years & Years (Palo Santo Tour), Jorge Celedón, Silvestre Dangond, and Alci Acosta

 Castillogrande or Castlegrande: the second zone of the Bocagrande and the most expensive of all. Most of the buildings are residential. On the south of the zone is located the naval club of Cartagena, and on the north is the New Hospital of Bocagrande, one of the most important hospitals of the neighborhood. In Castillogrande is located the embassy of the Dominican Republic in Colombia.
 South Bocagrande or Sucre Bocagrande: the commercial zone of Bocagrande. It has supermarkets, restaurants, the second mall of the neighborhood, and the last one, the Nao Mall. In this zone one can find the most traditional and important hotel of the city, the Almirante Hotel, which has received personalities like Barack Obama. The church of the zone is Nuestra señora del perpetuo socorro.
 El Lagüito or The Lake: the last zone of the neighborhood, and the most traditional,. It has parks, and several hotels such as the Hilton Hotel, Dann Hotel and Hotel Estelar Oceania. It is the smallest zone of the neighborhood, and the most old and traditional. It is known for having a lake in it, that gave it its name.

Transportation 
Bocagrande has no public transportation, but it is near a Transcaribe station.

The neighbourhood has the Bocagrande Station, one of the most important systems of the city, the Transcaribe.

Health 
Bocagrande is home to hospital and clinics of the city.
 Nuevo Hospital de Bocagrande is the biggest hospital in Bocagrande and the most important. It is located in the zone of Castillogrande.
 Medihelp Clinic  is located in the zone of Castillogrande, near the Nuevo Hospital de Bocagrande.
 Sonria and Coodontologos are the biggest dental clinics in town, and are located in South Bocagrande.
 Naval Hospital of Cartagena is one of the biggest hospitals in the city. It is located in the entrance of the neighborhood, between the city center and Plaza Bocagrande.
 Premium Care Clinic is a medical center for plastic surgery. It is located in the zone of El Lagüito.

Notable people born in Bocagrande 
 Orlando Cabrera
 Emiliano Fruto
 Sugar Ray Marimón
 Manuel Medrano
 Erick Morillo
 Giovanny Urshela

References 

Cartagena, Colombia